Khaled Eid (born 29 March 1964) is a retired Egyptian football midfielder and later manager. He was a squad member for the 1992 African Cup of Nations.

References

1964 births
Living people
Egyptian footballers
Ghazl El Mahalla SC players
Egyptian Premier League players
Egypt international footballers
1992 African Cup of Nations players
Association football midfielders
Egyptian football managers
Fujairah FC managers
Pyramids FC managers
Ghazl El Mahalla SC managers
Egyptian expatriate football managers
Expatriate football managers in the United Arab Emirates
Egyptian expatriate sportspeople in the United Arab Emirates
Egyptian Premier League managers